Visit and Search is the right of a belligerent warship, under certain conditions, to board a neutral merchant ship in order to verify its true character. The term probably refers to a misunderstanding of the French word , which in this context simply means search.

Declaration of London
The regulation of naval search during time of war was codified as part of the Declaration of London (1903). However, no state ratified the declaration so it had no force in international law.

The intent of the declaration was as follows.
The right of search belongs to belligerents alone. Its object is to verify the nationality of the vessel and if neutral to ascertain whether it carries contraband. The consequence of resistance to search is capture and trial in a Prize court. Article 63 of the Declaration states that "Forcible resistance to the legitimate exercise of the right of stoppage, search and capture involves in all cases the condemnation of the vessel. The cargo is liable to the same treatment as the cargo of an enemy vessel. Goods belonging to the master or owner of the vessel are treated as enemy goods." At the Hague Convention of 1907, the question of the liability to search of mail-ships gave rise to much discussion based on incidents arising out of the Boer and Russo-Japanese Wars. It was ultimately decided under a separate article of the Hague conference that postal correspondence of neutrals and even of belligerents, and whether official or private, found on board a neutral or even an enemy ship should be "inviolable", and that though the ship should be detained, this correspondence had to be forwarded to its destination by the captor "with the least possible delay." The only exception to this exemption is correspondence destined for or proceeding from a blockaded port. As regards the mail-ships themselves, apart from this inviolability of the correspondence, no exemption or privilege is extended beyond the injunction that they should not be searched, except when absolutely necessary, and then only "with as much consideration and expedition as possible," which might just as well be said of all ships stopped or searched in international waters.

U.S. Navy
According to the U.S. Navy,

"Under the law of armed conflict, belligerent warships or aircraft may visit and search a merchant vessel for the purpose of determining its true character, i.e., enemy or neutral, nature of cargo, manner of employment, and other facts bearing on its relation to the conflict. Such visits occur outside neutral territorial seas. This right does not extend to visiting or searching warships or vessels engaged in government non-commercial service. In addition, neutral merchant vessels in convoy of neutral warships are exempt from visit and search, although the convoy commander may be required to certify the neutral character of merchant vessels' cargo."

See also 
 Law of Armed Conflict
 Blockade

References 

 OPNAVINST 3120.32C 11 April 1994, section 630.23

Law of the sea